Teodoro Valcárcel (17 October 1900 – 20 March 1942) was a Peruvian classical composer.

Born in Puno, Valcárcel studied at the Milan Conservatory, and was a pupil in Barcelona of Felipe Pedrell. He returned in 1920 to his native country, settling in Lima. Eight years later, he won a national prize in composition, at the same time receiving a gold medal from the government of Lima for his efforts in the study of local folk music. He returned to Europe in 1929, and the following year a concert consisting entirely of his music was heard in Paris. Valcárcel was a mestizo, and his music features Andean elements heavily. He published a number of collections of folk songs; original works include two ballets, a violin concerto, a variety of other orchestral pieces, and several chamber works; he also composed 3 ensayos for an ensemble of indigenous instruments. Valcárcel died in Lima. He was the uncle of composer Edgar Valcárcel.

References

1900 births
1942 deaths
Peruvian classical composers
Male classical composers
20th-century classical composers
20th-century male musicians
Peruvian male musicians
Milan Conservatory alumni
People from Puno Region